New York, N.Y. is an album by George Russell, originally released on Decca in either July or August 1959.

Recording and music
The album was recorded in 1958 and 1959. Vocalist Jon Hendricks links some of the orchestral performances.

Release and reception
New York, N.Y. was released by Decca Records in July or August 1959. The AllMusic review by Ken Dryden states that "George Russell was one of the most forward-thinking composers and arrangers on the jazz scene during the 1950s, but his work was generally more appreciated by musicians than the jazz-buying public. New York, New York [sic] represents one of many high points in his career... In Rodgers & Hart's "Manhattan", Russell has the soloists playing over the orchestra's vamp, while he also creates an imaginative "East Side Medley" combining the standards "Autumn in New York" and "How About You." His original material is just as striking as his arrangements".

Track listing 
All compositions by George Russell except as indicated
 "Manhattan" (Lorenz Hart, Richard Rodgers) - 10:34
 "Big City Blues" - 11:40
 Manhattan: "Rico" - 10:12
 East Side Medley: "Autumn in New York"/"How About You?" (Vernon Duke, Ira Gershwin)/(Ralph Freed, Burton Lane) - 8:01
 "A Helluva Town" - 5:01

Personnel 
 George Russell – arranger, conductor
 Art Farmer – trumpet
 Doc Severinsen – trumpet
 Ernie Royal – trumpet
 Joe Wilder – trumpet
 Joe Ferrante – trumpet
 Bob Brookmeyer - valve trombone
 Frank Rehak – trombone
 Tom Mitchell – trombone
 Jimmy Cleveland – trombone
 Hal McKusick – alto saxophone
 Phil Woods – alto saxophone
 John Coltrane – tenor saxophone
 Al Cohn – tenor saxophone
 Benny Golson – tenor saxophone
 Sol Schlinger – baritone saxophone
 Gene Allen – baritone saxophone
 Bill Evans – piano
 Barry Galbraith – guitar
 George Duvivier – bass
 Milt Hinton – bass
 Charlie Persip – drums
 Max Roach – drums
 Don Lamond – drums
 Al Epstein – percussion
 Jon Hendricks – vocals

Source:

References 

1959 albums
George Russell (composer) albums
Decca Records albums
Albums conducted by George Russell (composer)
Albums arranged by George Russell (composer)